C93 may refer to:
 C93 (Netherlands Antilles), a political party
 Ruy Lopez, Smyslov Variation chess openings ECO code
 C93FM, a Christchurch-based New Zealand radio
 Monocytic leukemia ICD-10 code
 Wages, Hours of Work and Manning (Sea) Convention (Revised), 1949 code
 C-93 Conestoga, a World War II American military aircraft
 Borchardt C-93, an 1893 pistol
 Current 93, an English experimental music band